Entomocorus benjamini is a species of driftwood catfish found in the Madeira River system in Bolivia and Brazil.  This species grows to a length of 7.0 cm and can be distinguished from it congeners in that the distal half of dorsal caudal fin lobe and the edge of the ventral lobe is pigmented.  E. benjamini has been classified as an invertivore that feeds on aquatic and terrestrial invertebrates (primarily insects), zooplankton (including cladocerans, copepods, and rotiferans), and both aquatic and terrestrial vegetation.  It has been noted that a single fish could ingest as many as 1700 planktonic crustaceans in a single night, when this species feeds near the water surface.

References

Further reading 
 Eigenmann, CH (1917). "New and rare species of South American Siluridae in the Carnegie Museum." Annals of Carnegie Museum.  11:398–404.  Original description.

Auchenipteridae
Fish of Bolivia
Fish described in 1917